A kapp (Pennsylvania German from German  Kappe meaning cap, cover, hood) is a Christian headcovering worn by many women of certain Anabaptist Christian denominations (especially among Mennonites, Amish, Schwarzenau Brethren and River Brethren of the Old Order Anabaptist and Conservative Anabaptist traditions), as well as certain Conservative Friends and Plain Catholics, in obedience to Paul the Apostle's command in .

Primitive forms of the kapp are seen in the depictions of early Christian women as portrayed in the "etchings in the Catacomb of Domitila in Rome—dating as far back as A.D. 95". The 12th century Waldensians wore the kapp in France and Italy, as did the early Anabaptists of the 16th century—a practice continued down to the present-day by Old Order Anabaptists and Conservative Anabaptists. 

Manuals of early Christianity, including the Didascalia Apostolorum and Pædagogus instructed that a headcovering must be worn by Christian women both during prayer and worship, as well as in public. Reflecting the practice of the primitive Church, the kapp is worn by certain Anabaptist Christian (especially among Mennonites, Amish, Schwarzenau Brethren and River Brethren) and Conservative Quaker women throughout the day based on Saint Paul's dictum that Christians are to "pray without ceasing", Saint Paul's teaching that women being unveiled is dishonourable, and as a reflection of the created order.

Kapps are designed "to be of ample size to cover most of the hair." Women from certain Anabaptist communities, such as the Beachy Amish Mennonites, may wear for their headcovering either a kapp or an opaque hanging veil. The front part of the kapp is known as the fedderdale, while the back part is known as the hinnerdale. The kapp is worn pinned to a woman's hair. During the wintertime, a bonnet is worn over the kapp to keep one warm, with certain Anabaptist Christian communities requiring the bonnet to be worn over the kapp when women leave the home.

Gallery

See also 

Cape dress

References

Further reading

External links 
Comparing Amish Women's Head Coverings - Amish America
Why do Amish and Mennonite women wear head coverings? - Abner Showalter (Anabaptist Doctrine)
What is the white cap that your ladies wear? - Pilgrim Mennonite Conference
Traditional Plain Dress Women's Caps - Quaker Jane (Conservative Friends)

Anabaptism
Headcovering
Religious headgear